Ptahmose was High Priest of Ptah in Memphis during the time of Thutmose III of the 18th Dynasty.

He held the titles of hereditary prince, count, seal-bearer of the king of Lower Egypt, sm-priest and High Priest of Ptah. A naos with statue of Ptahmose is located in Cairo Museum (CG 70038).

References

Memphis High Priests of Ptah
Priests of the Eighteenth Dynasty of Egypt
14th-century BC clergy
14th-century BC Egyptian people